"Butters' Very Own Episode" is the fourteenth and final episode of the fifth season of the animated television series South Park, and the 79th episode of the series overall. "Butters' Very Own Episode" originally aired in the United States on Comedy Central on December 12, 2001. In the episode, Butters survives a murder attempt by his own mother after discovering his father's homosexual dalliances and must travel back to South Park in time for his parents' wedding anniversary at Bennigan's. Meanwhile, Butters' parents join John and Patsy Ramsey, Gary Condit,  and O. J. Simpson in lying to the press about who murdered Butters.

The episode was written by series co-creator Trey Parker. It is notable for being the first episode to center on Butters and a parody of 1950s sitcoms, albeit in a more dark comedic route.

“Butters’ Very Own Episode” received largely positive reviews from critics, many of whom praised the shift of focus to Butters.

Plot
Butters expresses excitement about his parents' upcoming anniversary, which they are going to celebrate at Butters' favorite restaurant, Bennigan's. A few days before their anniversary, his mother, Linda, asks Butters to spy on his father, Chris, in order to find out what his gift for her will be so that her own will not fall short. While spying, Butters watches Chris enter first a gay theater and then a gay bathhouse (though Butters is too naive to understand the nature of his father's activity). Upon returning home, Butters reports to his mother about his father's whereabouts, leaving her appalled by her husband's homosexual affairs, becoming visibly distraught and unhinged. Linda then attempts to murder Butters by dumping her car in a river with him inside.

Hours later, Chris enters the home to find his wife attempting to hang herself. He rushes to her side and explains that his homoerotic tendencies stem from chatting with other bi-curious and married men on the Internet. He insists he still loves her and does not want to lose his family over his "addiction". Linda then admits to having drowned Butters, to which Chris promises that he will not let her go to jail. The next day, the Stotches confront the press about their son, stating that he was abducted by "some Puerto Rican guy". As the media centers in on the "missing child" case, the pair are inducted into a club of infamous, highly publicized characters whose loved ones have also been "taken from them by Some Puerto Rican Guy", including Gary Condit, O. J. Simpson, and John and Patricia Ramsey.

Butters, however, survives his mother's attempt to kill him in similar fashion to the infamous Susan Smith murder of her children, and brushes off the incident as an accident. He then sets off home, eager to get back in time to celebrate his parents' anniversary with them. He first does some singing and dancing at a seedy 'dance' club, and then heads down a scary road after getting directions from an Old Mechanic. He returns home to find his parents fighting over all the lies they have told. Upon hearing what the quarrel was about, he scolds them for lying and trying to teach him to lie.

Deciding to follow in their son's footsteps, they come clean to the media about the cover-up, revealing many unsettling facts to Butters in the process. Afterwards, Stan, Kyle and Cartman chastise Butters about his unhinged parents. Although he attempts to make light of the situation, Butters admits that he is now probably scarred for life, the boys are gonna really go to town on him, and sometimes lying really can be for the best.

Production
Written by series co-creator Trey Parker and directed by animation director Eric Stough, "Butters' Very Own Episode" was rated TV-MA in the United States, and originally aired on December 12, 2001 on Comedy Central.
In the DVD commentary, Parker and Stone indicate they planned to make Butters the fourth group member after Kenny was written off the show, and created this episode as a prelude to his assuming a more prominent role in the series.

Reception
IGN gave "Butters Very Own Episode" a positive rating of 8.5, stating, "There are several classic moments in this episode, but it all works so well because of the setup."

Legacy
At the time of the episode, suspicion hung over Gary Condit regarding the disappearance of Chandra Levy, and the Ramseys regarding the murder of their daughter JonBenét. However, someone else was later convicted for the murder of Chandra Levy and Condit was thought to be exonerated. (Subsequently, prosecutors dropped all charges on July 28, 2016, after an associate of the sole witness came forward with secret recordings in which the witness admitted to falsifying testimony about the murder of Chandra Levy. The murder of Chandra Levy therefore remains unsolved.) The Ramsey family were also deemed innocent by the district attorney in the case. In a 2011 interview, South Park creators Trey Parker and Matt Stone stated that they regretted how Condit and the Ramseys were portrayed in the episode.

Home media
"Butters' Very Own Episode", along with the fourteen other episodes from South Park: the Complete Fifth Season, were released on a three-disc DVD set in the United States on February 22, 2005. The set includes brief audio commentaries by Parker and Stone for each episode. The episode was also released on the two-disc DVD collection A Little Box of Butters.

References

External links

 "Butters' Very Own Episode" full episode at South Park Studios
 

Television episodes about child abuse
Cultural depictions of O. J. Simpson
Television episodes about infidelity
Killing of JonBenét Ramsey
LGBT-related South Park episodes
O. J. Simpson murder case
South Park (season 5) episodes
Television episodes about murder